Blaževci is a village in the municipalities of Teslić (Republika Srpska) and Tešanj, Bosnia and Herzegovina.

Demographics 
According to the 2013 census, its population was 90, with 89 living in the Tešanj part and 1 Serb living in the Teslić part.

References

Populated places in Tešanj
Populated places in Teslić